Michael Ovie Hunter professionally known as LONDON is a Nigerian-British Platinum record producer, and disc jockey, widely known for his tag "London". He is best known for producing "Gyrate" from Wizkid Grammy-nominated album Made in Lagos, and Rema international hit single Calm Down, which became the second Nigerian song to peak at number one on the India IMI International chart and also peak no.15 on Billboard Hot 100.

He has produced tracks for Rema, Crayon, Ayra Starr, Wizkid, Chris brown, Selena Gomez, 6lack, Yseult, and Ladipoe. He rose to stardom following his deal with Blowtime Entertainment in 2019. His production hits include Rema's: "Soundgasm", "Bad Commando", "Calm Down", Ayra Starr's: "Fashion Killa", "Bloody Samaritan", Tiwa Savage's: "Koroba", and Johnny Drille's: "Mystery Girl".

He currently has a publishing deal in a joint venture between Sony Music Publishing France and Bluesky Music Publishing.

Early life 
Michael Ovie Hunter was born in Kaduna, to a Nigerian Mom, from Isoko and a British Dad. Micheal grew up in the sub-division of the Northern Nigeria state, Kaduna, where he rounded up his high school in 2016. Micheal's musical career began in the church as a drummer and soon took personal lessons on beat making. He tells Tush Magazine, “I when, out of curiosity, I discovered the FL Studio software From a close friend in the company I worked for in Kaduna as a graphics designer.”

Career
In 2018, he produced "Turn Up" for DJ Tunez featuring Wizkid and Reekado Banks. In 2019, he decided to move to Lagos, to stay with Mavin's in-house producer BabyFresh, who eventually signed him to Blowtime Entertainment, a division of Mavin. His production tag was first introduced to the public on 12 July 2019, following the release of Crayon debut EP "Cray Cray", on the opening track "So Fine", produced by London, and BabyFresh. In October 2019, he had his solo production breakthrough with Rema's debut EP Bad Commando, named after the opening track "Bad Commando", which he produced. Then went on to work on Wizkid project Soundman Vol. 1, on the track "Electric", in which he was featured.

London served as the executive producer on Rema's debut studio album Rave & Roses, producing 14 songs out of 16 tracks on the album. On 22 April 2022, while speaking with Notion magazine, he disclosed being the primary producer of the studio album Rave & Roses, and almost gave up on working on the album because he got scared at some point following the deadline date to meet up with, he says. On 14 July 2022, he tells Mixmag writer Shirley Ahura, “Working on Rema’s album is one of my proudest achievements, honestly. To see how people are accepting it and vibing to it gives me more motivation to keep going, to keep doing what I know how to do best.”, he says.

On 5 March 2021, following the release of Coming 2 America soundtrack album, he re-make the song "Koroba" by Tiwa Savage for  Amazon Studios, and Def Jam Recordings.

Artisty
Notion described his sound as a blend of “weaving church influences and R&B elements”. He cited Sarz, OVO 40, Bursbrain, Killatunez, and Don Jazzy, as his musical influence.

Production discography

Albums/EPs

Singles produced

Awards and nominations

References

Living people
Year of birth missing (living people)
Nigerian record producers